Normophosphatemic familial tumoral calcinosis is a cutaneous disorder characterized by cutaneous calcification or ossification.

See also 
 Progressive systemic sclerosis
 List of cutaneous conditions
 List of genes mutated in cutaneous conditions

References 

Connective tissue diseases